The 2003 UCI Road World Cup was the fifteenth edition of the UCI Road World Cup.

Races

Final standings

Riders

Teams

References

 
UCI
UCI Road World Cup (men)